Costanza Bonadonna (born 1971) is an Italian earth scientist who is a Full Professor of volcanology and geological risk at the University of Geneva. In 2020, she was named President-Elect of volcanology, geochemistry, and petrology at the American Geophysical Union (AGU).

Early life and education 
Bonadonna became interested in science and nature as a child. She has said that because she was raised in Paris she became aware at an early age about the impact of natural risks. When she was at high school Franco Barberi came to deliver a lecture in which he discussed the science of risk reduction during volcanic eruptions. She realised that whilst volcanic eruptions can be devastating for communities, they can bring benefits, including fertilisation of soils. She earned her laurea in geology at the University of Pisa. She moved to the University of Bristol for her PhD, where her research investigated models for the dispersal of tephra.

Research and career 
Bonadonna's research investigates physical volcanology, volcanic ash, hazard assessment and geological risk After completing her PhD, Bonadonna was appointed as a school of ocean and earth science and technology (SOEST) young investigator at the University of Hawaiʻi. Bonadonna develops computational models to describe sedimentation from volcanic plumes. Soon after she moved to the University of South Florida. Since 2007, she has served as Director of the Assessment and management of Geological and Climate-Related Risks (CERG-C) programme at the University of Geneva. In 2018, she was appointed Vice Dean of the Faculty of Science.

Bonadonna research focuses on the modeling of particle sedimentation from volcanic plumes (so-called tephra or pyroclastic sediments), the development of new methodologies for the characterisation of tephra-fallout deposits as well as the development of probabilistic strategies to assess the hazard of tephra-fallout deposits. She is also active in the linkage between model development and risk assessment and mitigation in the effort of bridging the gap between scientists and non-scientists (e.g. emergency management planners, government officials). She has been involved in many international projects for the assessment and quantification of volcanic hazard and risk. She was named President-Elect of Volcanology, Geochemistry, and Petrology section at the American Geophysical Union in 2020.

Awards and honours 
 2001 Geological Society of London president's award
 2004 International Association of Volcanology and Chemistry of the Earth's Interior (IAVCEI) outstanding recent graduate
 2004 Geological Society of America Outstanding Woman in Science Award
 2005 University of South Florida outstanding faculty research achievement award
 2020 European Platform of Women Scientists woman scientist of the month 
2020 Italian Rotary Clubs for Sciences International Galileo Galilei Award

Selected publications

References 

Italian volcanologists
Alumni of the University of Bristol
American Geophysical Union
Geological Society of London
Living people
1971 births
Date of birth missing (living people)
Italian women geologists
University of Pisa alumni
Place of birth missing (living people)
Academic staff of the University of Geneva